is the 34th single by Japanese entertainer Miho Nakayama. Written by Masato Odake and Yoshimasa Inoue, the single was released on June 7, 1996, by King Records.

Background and release
The B-side, "Fui no Kiss", was used by Astel Tokyo for a commercial featuring Nakayama.

"True Romance" peaked at No. 37 on Oricon's weekly singles chart and sold over 38,000 copies, becoming Nakayama's first single to sell less than 100,000 copies.

Track listing
All music is arranged by Hajime Mizoguchi.

Charts

References

External links

1996 singles
1996 songs
Japanese-language songs
Miho Nakayama songs
King Records (Japan) singles